The Tripura High Court is the High Court of the state of Tripura.  It was established on 23 March 2013, after making suitable amendments in the Constitution of India and North-Eastern Areas (Re-organisation) Act, 1971. The seat of the High Court is at Agartala, the capital of Tripura. The first Chief Justice was Justice Deepak Gupta ( 23.3.2013 to 16.5.2016)  Earlier, the state of Tripura along with the other six states of the North - East of India was under the Guwahati High Court , a permanent bench of the Guwahati High Court was established in Agartala in the year 1992 having territorial jurisdiction of the state of Tripura.

The Chief Justice
The Acting Chief Justice of this Court is  Justice T. Amarnath Goud. He took oath on 23 February 2023.

Former Chief Justices

References

External links 
 Tripura High Court
 Tripura High Court Exam's Call Letter
 

Government of Tripura
2013 establishments in Tripura
Courts and tribunals established in 2013